Geraldine Peten was a Democratic member of the Arizona House of Representatives, representing District 4. She was appointed by the Maricopa County Board of Supervisors to replace former representative Jesus Rubalcava. Peten was the seatmate of the Democratic Leader of the Arizona House of Representatives Charlene Fernandez.

Electoral history

References

External links
 Peten Biography at Ballotpedia

Living people
Members of the Arizona House of Representatives
People from Maricopa County, Arizona
Year of birth missing (living people)
21st-century American politicians